Applied Physiology, Nutrition, and Metabolism/Physiologie appliquée, nutrition et métabolisme is a bimonthly peer-reviewed medical journal published by NRC Research Press. It was established in 1976 as the Canadian Journal of Sport Sciences and later renamed Canadian Journal of Applied Physiology before obtaining its current name. 

It covers research on physiology, nutrition, and metabolism aspects of human health, physical activity, and fitness; in addition to the regular issues, it often publishes supplemental thematic issues. Papers appear online in advance of the print issue and are available in both PDF and HTML formats. 

The editor-in-chiefs are Wendy E. Ward and Phil Chilibeck. It is an official journal of the Canadian Society for Exercise Physiology and the Canadian Nutrition Society.

Abstracting and indexing 
The journal is abstracted and indexed in:

References

External links 
 

Nutrition and dietetics journals
Bimonthly journals
Publications established in 1976
Multilingual journals
Canadian Science Publishing academic journals